The H.F. Smith House, at 721 W. Harvey Ave. in Wellington, Kansas, is a Queen Anne-style house built in 1886 as a one-story residence.  It was expanded in 1896 by builder and architect Elbert Dumond to become the two-story Queen Anne Free Classic structure that it is now.

It was listed on the National Register of Historic Places in 2007.

References

Houses on the National Register of Historic Places in Kansas
Queen Anne architecture in Kansas
Houses completed in 1886
National Register of Historic Places in Sumner County, Kansas